Penicillium turcosoconidiatum is a species of fungus in the genus Penicillium which was isolated from fynbos soil in Stellenbosch, South Africa.

The specific epithet turcosoconidiatum refers to the light blue turquoise conidia it forms on malt extract agar.

Description
Penicillium turcosoconidiatum is in the P. fuscum-clade of Penicillium and is distinguished from other similar species by:
 its limited growth on malt extract agar, Czapek, and yeast extract with supplements (YES) growth media
 short stipes
 size of conidia (2–2.5 μm)
 turquoise-colored conidia

References 

turcosoconidiatum
Fungi described in 2014